Martin C. Sullivan (October 2, 1862 in Lowell, Massachusetts – January 6, 1894 in Lowell, Massachusetts), was a Major League Baseball outfielder. He played all or part of five seasons in the majors, from -, for the Cleveland Spiders, Chicago White Stockings, Boston Beaneaters, and Indianapolis Hoosiers.

External links

1862 births
1894 deaths
Major League Baseball infielders
Cleveland Spiders players
Chicago White Stockings players
Boston Beaneaters players
Indianapolis Hoosiers (NL) players
Baseball players from Massachusetts
Sportspeople from Lowell, Massachusetts
19th-century baseball players
Boston Blues players